The 1944–45 Indiana Hoosiers men's basketball team represented Indiana University. Their head coach was Harry Good, who was in his 2nd year. The team played its home games in The Fieldhouse in Bloomington, Indiana, and was a member of the Big Ten Conference.

The Hoosiers finished the regular season with an overall record of 10–11 and a conference record of 3–9, finishing 9th in the Big Ten Conference. Indiana was not invited to participate in any postseason tournament.

Roster

Schedule/Results

|-
!colspan=8| Regular Season
|-

References

Indiana Hoosiers
Indiana Hoosiers men's basketball seasons
1944 in sports in Indiana
1945 in sports in Indiana